Jiří Adam (born 12 October 1950) is a Czech modern pentathlete and épée fencer. He won a silver medal in the team modern pentathlon event at the 1976 Summer Olympics and finished in 29th place in the individual event.

References

External links
 

1950 births
Living people
Czech male épée fencers
Czechoslovak male épée fencers
Czech male modern pentathletes
Olympic fencers of Czechoslovakia
Olympic modern pentathletes of Czechoslovakia
Czechoslovak male modern pentathletes
Fencers at the 1980 Summer Olympics
Modern pentathletes at the 1976 Summer Olympics
Olympic silver medalists for Czechoslovakia
Olympic medalists in modern pentathlon
Sportspeople from Prague
Medalists at the 1976 Summer Olympics